The First National Bank Building in downtown Beaumont, Texas was built in 1937 and is an excellent example of  Art Deco architecture. The building is four stories tall and decorated with reliefs of workers and business people designed by Beaumont-based sculptor Matchett Herring Coe.

Photo gallery

See also

National Register of Historic Places listings in Jefferson County, Texas
Recorded Texas Historic Landmarks in Jefferson County

References

External links

Buildings and structures in Beaumont, Texas
Art Deco architecture in Texas
Historic district contributing properties in Texas
Commercial buildings completed in 1937
National Register of Historic Places in Jefferson County, Texas